Joseph William Champness (born 27 April 1997) is a New Zealand professional footballer and rapper who plays as a winger for the New Zealand national team. Born in New Zealand but raised in Australia, Champness represents New Zealand in international competition after switching from Australia in 2021.

Early life
Champness attended St Patrick's College where he was college captain in 2014. His younger brother Daniel Francis Champness, who was also college captain, plays as a midfielder for Moreton Bay United.

Football career

Club

Newcastle Jets
Champness signed a scholarship contract with the Newcastle Jets along with three other emerging youngsters in January 2017 until the end of the 2017-18 season, but almost immediately after the deals were announced Champness and former emerging Jet Antonee Burke signed a loan deal with Portuguese 2nd Division club Academica de Coimbra through to mid-2017. Champness spent his time at Academica playing football for the reserve team and occasionally training with the first team.

Champness had a successful pre-season in 2017 appearing regularly for the first team, scoring four goals and impressing new coach Ernie Merrick enough to reward him with a three-year deal until 2019/20 although he will still be playing under the scholarship contract for the 2017-18 season. Champness made his professional debut on the 7 October 2017 away to the Central Coast Mariners coming on late and scoring a goal in the 81st minute. Champness then started his first professional game in Round 5 at home against the Wellington Phoenix. Champness scored his second goal for Newcastle in round 8 starting the game and scoring in the 75th minute in the Jets 4-1 win over the Melbourne Victory.

On 14 August 2019, prior to the season after spending most of the pre-season in the United States, Champness decided to quit playing soccer, so that he can follow his music dream. He made statements to the effect that if he decides to return to playing in the next three years, he would come back to Newcastle Jets.

Brisbane Roar
Following his musical career break from football Champness joined Brisbane Roar on loan ahead of the 2020–21 A-League season, angering many in the Newcastle camp over his backing out of the alleged "deal" to return to the Jets.

Giresunspor
Champness joined Giresunspor in the Turkish Super League on a 3 year contract with a possible one year extension into the 2024/25 season. Due to unpaid wages he left the club in March 2022 after 13 games, having scored 4 goals while coming on as a substitute in almost all of his matches. Champness terminated the contract and proceeded with a FIFA Dispute Resolution claim. FIFA found in favour of Champness and awarded him €790,000 Euros (1.33 million New Zealand Dollars) plus interest.

International
Champness was born in New Zealand to an Australian father and a Filipino mother, making him eligible to represent New Zealand, Australia and Philippines at international level.

He has represented Australia at youth level, and was a member of the Young Socceroos team in the 2016 AFC U-19 Championship in Bahrain.

It was reported on 14 June 2021 that Champness changed his international allegiance to New Zealand. On 25 June, Champness was selected in the New Zealand squad competing in the Olympics. He made his debut for the New Zealand national football team on 12 October 2021 in a friendly against Bahrain.

Club statistics

Honours

International
Australia
 AFF U-19 Youth Championship: 2016

Music career
Outside from his football career, Champness releases music under the name JOWIC. He has released 5 singles as of May 2021. His biggest single, "My Plan" was released in February 2020, amassing over 3.5 million combined views over multiple platforms, and placements on the music TV stations BET Jams and VH1 Soul.

Critical response

“My Plan” received a 3.5/5 rating from Triple J critic Dave Ruby Howe, who compared the style of the song to PartyNextDoor and Bryson Tiller.

In 2019, Champness left the Newcastle Jets to pursue a music career in Los Angeles. Champness came back to Australia in the wake of the COVID-19 pandemic, and signed on loan with the Brisbane Roar. This caused a backlash from the Jets, who claimed that Champness had signed a contract that said if he came back from Los Angeles within 3 years, he would only be able to play for them.

References

External links

1997 births
Living people
Association footballers from Auckland
New Zealand association footballers
New Zealand international footballers
Olympic association footballers of New Zealand
Australian soccer players
Australia under-20 international soccer players
New Zealand people of Australian descent
Australian people of New Zealand descent
New Zealand people of Filipino descent
Australian people of Filipino descent
Australian sportspeople of Asian descent
Sportspeople of Filipino descent
Association football forwards
A-League Men players
Campeonato de Portugal (league) players
Süper Lig players
Newcastle Jets FC players
Brisbane Roar FC players
Giresunspor footballers
Footballers at the 2020 Summer Olympics
Associação Académica de Coimbra – O.A.F. players
Australian expatriate sportspeople in Turkey
New Zealand expatriate sportspeople in Turkey